Georg Margreitter (born 7 November 1988) is an Austrian professional footballer who plays as a central defender for Swiss Super League side Grasshopper Club Zürich.

Career
Margreitter began his professional career with Austrian Bundesliga club LASK Linz in 2007, making his first team debut on 28 July 2007 against Red Bull Salzburg.

Early career
In Summer 2008 he was loaned out to the newly formed Magna Wiener Neustadt. Margreitter established himself as a regular member of their central defence as the club won the Austrian Football First League (second tier).

He returned to LASK for the 2009–10 season and was made captain. In Summer 2010 he moved to fellow top flight side Austria Vienna, where he signed a contract until 2013. Here, he played European football with the team in the UEFA Europa League.

Wolverhampton Wanderers
On 24 August 2012, Margreitter joined English side Wolverhampton Wanderers signing a four-year contract for an undisclosed fee, reported to be around £500,000. He made his club debut on 30 August 2012 in a 3–1 League Cup win at Northampton. Much of his season was however affected by injury problems, as well as the departure of Ståle Solbakken as manager, while subsequent managers did not select Margreitter. His sole league appearance for the club during the 2012–13 campaign was a ten-minute spell as a substitute in a match at Ipswich. His third and what turned out to be final appearance for the club came in a 6-0 defeat to Chelsea in the League Cup. The season saw the club relegated for a consecutive season, prompting to Margreitter to blog that there had been a "lack of hunger" among the players to win matches.

Out of the plans of new Wolves manager Kenny Jackett, Margreitter was sent on a season-long loan to Copenhagen in September 2013, where he reunited with his former Wolves manager Ståle Solbakken and played in the Champions League.

After returning to Wolves he was loaned out again, joining English League One side Chesterfield in September 2014 in a three-month deal, making 14 appearances in total, scoring once against Notts County.

On 4 August 2015, Wolves announced that Margreitter and the club had reached an agreement to cancel his contract, which had one year left to run.

1. FC Nürnberg 
On 24 August he signed a deal with German 2. Bundesliga side 1. FC Nürnberg. He quickly grew out to become an integral part of the defense. In 2018, Margreitter and Nürnberg reached promotion to the Bundesliga, after having been down in the second tier for four years. On 3 December 2018, he scored his first Bundesliga-goal in a 1–1 draw against Bayer Leverkusen.

Grasshopper Club Zürich 
On 5 July 2021, Margreitter signed with Grasshopper Club Zürich for one year. He quickly established himself as the leader of Grasshopper's defence and of the team as a whole, even captaining the squad on occasion. He shot his first goal in the Super League on 21 August 2021, in a 2:1 loss against city rivals FC Zürich. His contract was extended by a further year on 20 April 2022.

References

External links
 
 Georg Margreitter Interview

1988 births
Living people
People from Bludenz District
Association football defenders
Austrian footballers
Austria youth international footballers
FK Austria Wien players
Wolverhampton Wanderers F.C. players
F.C. Copenhagen players
Chesterfield F.C. players
1. FC Nürnberg players
Grasshopper Club Zürich players
Austrian Football Bundesliga players
English Football League players
Danish Superliga players
Bundesliga players
2. Bundesliga players
Expatriate footballers in England
Austrian expatriate footballers
Expatriate men's footballers in Denmark
Expatriate footballers in Germany
Expatriate footballers in Switzerland
Footballers from Vorarlberg